List of rivers in Missouri (U.S. state).

By drainage basin
This list is arranged by drainage basin, with respective tributaries indented under each larger stream's name.

Mississippi River

Arkansas River
Mississippi River
Arkansas River (AR, OK)
Neosho River (KS, OK)
Elk River
Buffalo Creek
Indian Creek
Big Sugar Creek
Little Sugar Creek
Spring River
Shoal Creek
Capps Creek

White River
Mississippi River
White River
Cache River
Black River
Spring River
Warm Fork Spring River
Anthony Branch
Eleven Point River
Current River
Sinking Creek
Little Black River
Jacks Fork
Logan Creek
Adair Creek
North Fork River
Bennetts Bayou
Bennetts River
Bryant Creek
Brush Creek
Hunter Creek
Whites Creek
Fox Creek
Rippee Creek
Spring Creek
Clifty Creek
Little North Fork White River
Beaver Creek
Cowskin Creek
Prairie Creek
Little Beaver Creek
James River
Crane Creek
Finley Creek
Pierson Creek
Wilsons Creek
Jordan Creek
Fassnight Creek
Kings River
Osage Creek
Roaring River

Mississippi River between the White and Missouri rivers
Mississippi River
St. Francis River
Little River 
Castor River
Whitewater River
Little St. Francis River
Headwater Diversion Channel
Whitewater River
Castor River
Old River
River aux Vases
Meramec River
Big River
Terre Bleue Creek
Andrews Branch
Bourbeuse River
Little Bourbeuse River
Little Meramec River
Huzzah Creek
Courtois Creek
Abbott Branch
Shoal Creek  
Dry Fork
River des Peres

Missouri River
Mississippi River
Missouri River
Loutre River
Gasconade River
Big Piney River
Roubidoux Creek
Osage Fork Gasconade River
Auxvasse Creek
Middle River
Osage River 
Maries River
Little Maries River
Tavern Creek
Grandglaize Creek
Wet Glaize Creek
Dry Auglaize Creek
Niangua River
Little Niangua River
South Grand River
Big Creek
Pomme de Terre River
Little Sac River
North Dry Sac River
South Dry Sac River
Little Osage River
Marmaton River
Green River
Marais des Cygnes River
Moreau River
Lamine River
Blackwater River 
Little Chariton River
East Fork Little Chariton River   
 Walnut Creek
Silver Creek
Turner Fork
Middle Fork Little Chariton River  
Chariton River 
Bee Branch  
Elm Creek  
Mussel Fork  
Shoal Creek  
Grand River
Locust Creek
Medicine Creek
Thompson River
Weldon River
Little River
Crooked River
Fishing River
Little Blue River
Blue River
Brush Creek
Round Grove Creek
Platte River
One Hundred and Two River
Nodaway River
Squaw Creek
Tarkio River
Nishnabotna River

Mississippi River north of the Missouri River
Mississippi River
Cuivre River
Salt River
Spencer Creek (Salt River)
Black Creek (North Fork Salt River tributary)
Hilton Branch
South River
North River
Fabius River
North Fabius River
Middle Fabius River
South Fabius River
Little Fabius River
Wyaconda River
Little Wyaconda River
Fox River
Little Fox River
Des Moines River

Alphabetically

See also

List of rivers of the United States
State Line Slough (Missouri)

Notes

References
USGS Geographic Names Information Service
USGS Hydrologic Unit Map - State of Missouri (1974)

External links
Missouri's Watersheds
Missouri Streamflow Data from the USGS

Missouri rivers
 
Rivers